Atlantic Union Bankshares Corporation ("the Company") is a bank holding company headquartered in Richmond, Virginia which has Virginia roots dating back to 1900. Through its subsidiaries, the Company offers a wide range of personal and business financial services including checking and savings accounts, credit cards, various lending products, and wealth management. With 114 branches across Virginia, Maryland, and North Carolina, Atlantic Union Bank ("the Bank") is the Company's primary subsidiary.

History

Atlantic Union Bank

The Bank was founded as First Market Bank, FSB on November 4, 1997 in Memphis, Tennessee as a joint venture between Ukrop's Food Group and National Commerce Bancorporation, later acquired by Suntrust Banks.

In March 2005, the Bank relocated its headquarters to Richmond.

In March 2006, SunTrust sold its 49% interest in the Bank to Markel Corporation, a property and casualty insurer, for $82.6 million.

On February 1, 2010, the Bank was acquired in a $105 million transaction by Bowling Green-based Union Bankshares Corporation. Throughout 2010, the Company consolidated its subsidiaries Union Bank and Trust Co., Northern Neck State Bank, and The Rappahannock National Bank of Washington into the Bank and changed its name to Union First Market Bank.

In January 2014, the Company purchased StellarOne Corporation in a stock transaction valued at $445 million. The Bank then absorbed StellarOne Bank, founded in 1900 as The Second National Bank of Culpepper,  to create the largest community bank headquartered in Virginia in May 2014.

In February 2015, the Bank changed its name to Union Bank & Trust.

In January 2018, the Company completed the $701 million acquisition of Xenith Bankshares, Inc., the largest such Virginia banking transaction in decades, and merged Xenith Bank, formerly known as the Bank of Hampton Roads, into the Bank. The  deal expanded the Bank's footprint across all of Hampton Roads and into Maryland and North Carolina.

In May 2019, the Bank changed its name to Atlantic Union Bank.

References

External links

1997 establishments in Tennessee
Banks based in Virginia
American companies established in 1997
Banks established in 1997
Companies based in Richmond, Virginia
Companies listed on the Nasdaq